Lim Si Cheng (born 17 February 1949) is a Malaysian politician of the Malaysian Chinese Association (MCA), a Chinese member of the Barisan National (BN). He was served as Deputy Speaker of the Dewan Rakyat from 1999 to 2008.

Election results

Honours
  :
  Commander of the Order of Meritorious Service (PJN) - Datuk (1997)

References

1949 births
Living people
People from Johor
Malaysian politicians of Chinese descent
Malaysian Chinese Association politicians
Members of the Dewan Rakyat
Members of the Johor State Legislative Assembly
Commanders of the Order of Meritorious Service